Ivory is a substance found in the teeth and tusks of animals such as elephants.

Ivory may also refer to:

People 
 Ivory (wrestler), American wrestler Lisa Mary Moretti (born 1961)

Surname 
 George Ivory (disambiguation), several people
 Horace Ivory (born 1954), American football player
 James Ivory (disambiguation), several people
 Judith Ivory, American romance novelist
 Thomas Ivory (1709–1779), British architect
 Thomas Ivory (Irish architect) (died 1786)
 Trevor Ivory, British political candidate

Given name 
 Ivory Aquino (born 1977/1978), Filipina-American actress
 Ivory Crockett (born 1948), American sprinter
 Ivory Harris, American drug trafficker
 Ivory O. Hillis Jr. (born 1930), American politician
 Ivory Joe Hunter (1914–1974), American R&B singer, songwriter and pianist
 Ivory Kimball (1843–1916), American lawyer and judge
 Ivory Latta (born 1984), American basketball player
 Ivory Lee Brown (born 1969), American football player
 Ivory V. Nelson, American educator
 Ivory Nwokorie, Nigerian powerlifter
 Ivory Quinby (1817–1869), American businessman
 Ivory Sully (born 1957), American football player
 Ivory A. Toldson (born c. 1974), American academic
 Ivory Williams (born 1985), American sprinter

Places
 Ivory, Jura, a commune in the Jura department of France
 Ivory, Maryland, United States
 Ivory Park, Gauteng
 Port Ivory, Staten Island

Other uses 
 Ivory (color), an off-white color
 RAL 1014 Ivory, a RAL color
 Ivory (soap), a personal care brand
 Ivory (Teena Marie album)
 Ivory (Gin Wigmore album)
 Ivory (Omar Apollo album), 2022
 "Ivory" (song), by Dragon Ash
 Ivory (CPU), a VLSI processor, especially for Lisp Microcode
 Ivory (mango),a mango cultivar
 Hornbill ivory, an ornamental material derived from a bird's bill
 Pink ivory, an African tree and the wood derived from it
 Ivory palm, a South American tree and the carvable tissue derived from it

See also 
 Ivory Coast, a country in Africa
 Ivory Tower (disambiguation)